Crown Pop (stylized as CROWN POP) is a Japanese girl idol group belonging to Section 2 of the talent agency Stardust Promotion.

The band's nickname is Kurapo. The nickname for its fans is "Poppers".

History 
The group was created on August 8, 2015, consisting of several junior high and high school girls who were noted at Stardust Planet for their dance skills. The group's name originates from its concept of "working hard to polish dance skills in order to grab the entertainment world's crown".

The name "Crown Pop" was announced during their live debut performance that took place on December 5, 2015 at the "Please Don't Forget Tohoku" event in Sendai.

In September 2017, the group announced its first mini-album, Change the World!. The album was sold only at the group's live concerts.

After several member changes, the group settled with six members in January 2018: Mita Ibuki, Saho Tanaka, Kaori Yamamoto, Rina, Airi Fujita, and Mia Yuzuki. The first concert with the current line-up of six members was held on January 28, 2018 at Akihabara Zest and was titled .

On May 27, 2018, the group announced its first single, "Real×live", with a song titled "EGO×search" as a coupling track. This, like Change the World!, was only distributed at live concerts.

On October 23, 2018, the group released (through Music@Note, a record label created as a collaboration between Tower Records Japan and a pop culture event called @Jam) its first nationally distributed single, . The single reached number 19 on the Japanese weekly Oricon singles chart.

On September 14, 2020, Kaori Yamamoto announced that she will graduate on September 27 at the band's "Solo Birthday" live.

Musical and lyrical style 
"Gogo Yoji goro no Suki Desu", the title track of the group's album Change the World!, is a sour-sweet rock song full of teenage racing heartbeats and vacillating emotions.

Members

Former Members 

Interviews with the members

Timeline

Discography

EPs

Albums

Singles

Notes

References

External links 
  

Japanese idol groups
Japanese girl groups
Musical groups established in 2015
2015 establishments in Japan
Japanese pop music groups
Musical groups from Tokyo
Stardust Promotion artists
Child musical groups